Don Bosco College, Maram, established in 2000, is a general degree college in Maram, Senapati district, Manipur. It offers  undergraduate(Science, Arts & Commerce) and postgraduate course. It is affiliated to  Manipur University.

Departments

Science
Physics
Chemistry
Mathematics
Computer Science
Biotechnology
Botany
Zoology

Arts and Commerce
English
History
Political Science
Economics
Education
Sociology
Social Work
Commerce

PG DEGREE COURSES
Master of Sociology
Master of English
Master of Political Science

Accreditation
The college is recognized by the University Grants Commission (UGC).

See also
Education in India
Manipur University
Literacy in India
List of institutions of higher education in Manipur

References

External links
https://dbcmaram.ac.in/

Colleges affiliated to Manipur University
Educational institutions established in 2000
Universities and colleges in Manipur
2000 establishments in Manipur